The Lakeland Flying Tigers are a Minor League Baseball team of the Florida State League and the Single-A affiliate of the Detroit Tigers. They are located in Lakeland, Florida, and play their home games at Publix Field at Joker Marchant Stadium.

History

The team was established in 1960 as the Lakeland Indians, an affiliate of the Cleveland Indians. After a one-year hiatus, the team was restarted in 1962 as the Lakeland Giants, an affiliate of the San Francisco Giants. 

The franchise affiliated with the Detroit Tigers' farm system in 1963 and became known as the Lakeland Tigers before becoming the Flying Tigers in 2007. The relationship with Detroit is one of the two longest unbroken affiliate relationships currently existing.

 In 1997, playing with the Tigers, Gabe Kapler led the Florida State League in doubles and total bases, and tied for first in extra base hits. 

In 2012, the Flying Tigers won their first FSL title in 20 years by defeating the Jupiter Hammerheads, three games to two. It was the fourth league title in club history.

In 2006, the team introduced a new name and colors to pay homage to the Lakeland School of Aeronautics, later the Lodwick School of Aeronautics. The school trained over 8,000 pilots between 1940 and 1945, some of whom later flew with the Flying Tigers in China during World War II, and was actually located at the current site of Publix Field at Joker Marchant Stadium.

Roster

Notable alumni

Baseball Hall of Fame alumni 
Jack Morris (1989) Inducted 2018 

John Smoltz (1986) Inducted, 2015
Notable former ballplayers

Tony Clark (1993) MLB All-Star

Francisco Cordero (1998) 3 x MLB All-Star

 Juan Encarnacion (1994, 1996)
 Mark Fidrych (1975, 1978) 2 x MLB All-Star; 1976 AL ERA Leader; 1976 AL Rookie of the Year

Tito Fuentes (1962)

 Kirk Gibson (1978) 1986 NL Most Valuable Player; 2011 NL Manager of the Year
Curtis Granderson, 3 x MLB All-Star; Member of the 20-20-20-20 Club

Jerry Grote (1985-MGR) 2 x MLB All-Star

 Carlos Guillén (2011) 3 x MLB All-Star

Bill Gullickson (1993) 1991 AL Wins Leader

 Omar Infante (2000) MLB All-Star

 Howard Johnson (1979-1980) 2 x MLB All-Star

Gabe Kapler (1997), Outfielder and manager

 Ron Leflore (1974) MLB All-Star; 2 x AL Stolen Base Leader

 Rick Leach (1979)

 Jim Leyland (1964, 1969, 1976-1978-MGR) 3 x MLB Manager of the Year; Manager: 1997 World Series Champion - Florida Marlins

Jose Lima (1991-1992, 1995) MLB All-Star

 Sam McDowell (1960) 6 x MLB All-Star; 1965 AL ERA Leader
Elliott Maddox (1968)

Jerry Manuel (1973) 2000 AL Manager of the Year

Andrew Miller (2007) 2 x MLB All-Star

Phil Nevin (1997) MLB All-Star

 Lance Parrish (1975) 8 x MLB All-Star

 Dan Petry (1977, 1986) MLB All-Star

 Rick Porcello (2008) 2016 AL Cy Young Award

 Fernando Rodney (1999, 2001) 3 x MLB All-Star
Cody Ross

 Vern Ruhle (1973)
Chuck Scrivener

 Gary Sheffield (2008) 9 x MLB All-Star; 1992 NL Batting Title

Drew Smyly

Walt Terrell (1988) 
Pat Underwood

 Ugueth Urbina (2004) 2 x MLB All-Star
Justin Verlander (2005) 6 x MLB All-Star; 2006 AL Rookie of the Year; 2011 AL Cy Young Award; 2011 AL Most Valuable Player; etc.

David Wells (1994) 3 x MLB All-Star; 1998-Pitched Perfect Game

 Lou Whitaker (1976) 5 x MLB All-Star; 1978 AL Rookie of the Year

 Dontrelle Willis (2009) 2 x MLB All-Star; 2003 NL Rookie of the Year

John Wockenfuss (1987) 

Dmitri Young (2006) 2 x MLB All-Star

Playoffs
2012: Defeated Dunedin 2–0 in semifinals; defeated Jupiter 3–2 to win championship.
2005: Defeated Dunedin 2–0 in semifinals; lost to Palm Beach 3–2 in finals.
2002: Defeated Jupiter 2–0 in semifinals; lost to Charlotte 3–2 in finals.
1997: Lost to St. Petersburg 2–0 in semifinals.
1993: Lost to St. Lucie 2–1 in semifinals.
1992: Defeated West Palm Beach 2–0 in quarterfinals; defeated Clearwater 2–0 in semifinals; defeated Baseball City 2–0 to win championship.
1991: Lost to West Palm Beach 2–0 in semifinals.
1990: Lost to West Palm Beach 2–1 in semifinals.
1989: Lost to St. Petersburg 2–1 in semifinals.
1988: Lost to St. Lucie 2–1 in quarterfinals.
1987: Lost to Fort Lauderdale 2–0 in semifinals.
1978: Defeated St. Petersburg 1–0 in semifinals; lost to Miami 2–1 in finals.
1977: Defeated Miami 2–0 in semifinals; defeated St. Petersburg 3–1 to win championship.
1976: Defeated Miami 2–0 in semifinals; defeated Tampa 2–0 to win championship.
1974: Lost to Fort Lauderdale 2–0 in semifinals.
1973: Lost to West Palm Beach 2–1 in semifinals.
1970: Lost to Miami 2–0 in semifinals.

References

External links

TigsTown.com
Interview with the General Manager of the Lakeland Flying Tigers
Baseball Reference – Lakeland, Florida

Baseball teams established in 1960
Professional baseball teams in Florida
Sports in Lakeland, Florida
Cleveland Guardians minor league affiliates
Detroit Tigers minor league affiliates
San Francisco Giants minor league affiliates
Florida State League teams
1960 establishments in Florida
Sports in Polk County, Florida